Voici le temps des assassins (French for "This is the time for murderers") is a 1956 French crime film directed by Julien Duvivier and starring Jean Gabin and Danièle Delorme. The title is a line of Matinée d'ivresse - part of Illuminations by Arthur Rimbaud. The film was released as Deadlier Than the Male in the United States and as Twelve Hours to Live in the UK. It is a dark tale of a young and pretty femme fatale who ruins the life of a man and kills his best friend.

Plot
In Les Halles, in the heart of Paris, the long-divorced André Chatelin, an honest and respected man who runs a successful restaurant, is visited by an unknown young woman. She says she is Catherine, the daughter of his ex-wife Gabrielle, who has died leaving her homeless and penniless. André gives her a room and a job, but she soon starts abusing his kindness. She sows discord between André and his young friend Gérard, a medical student who is like a son to him. And she starts stealing money to support her mother, who is not dead but an ex-prostitute who is now a hopeless drug addict in a sordid hotel.

Feigning drunkenness one night, she gets André to help her to her bedroom and undress her, with the result that he marries her. As his heir she would be rich and free, so the next plan of her and her mother is to get rid of André. She decides to use Gérard, because of his medical knowledge, and swiftly seduces him. When he refuses to kill André, however, she strangles him and then pushes his car into the river with his corpse and his dog César. A grieving André identifies the body, leaving his telephone number with the police, who ring him to ask if he knows the woman seen in Gérard's car. From the description, it is obvious to him that it was Catherine. When he confronts her, she runs off to her mother's hotel. The dog César, who escaped drowning, follows her there and kills her.

Cast
 Jean Gabin as André Chatelin
 Danièle Delorme as Catherine
 Robert Arnoux as Bouvier
 Liliane Bert as Antoinette
 Gérard Blain as Gérard Delacroix
 Lucienne Bogaert as Gabrielle

Notes

External links
 
 
 
  Voici le temps des assassins at “Cinema-francais“ (French)
 Deadlier Than the Male movie review at The New York Times Last accessed: October 4, 2016.

1956 films
1956 crime films
French black-and-white films
Films directed by Julien Duvivier
Films set in Paris
1950s French-language films
French crime films
1950s French films